The Hong Kong Classic Mile is a domestic Group 1 four year old set weights Thoroughbred horse race in Hong Kong, run over a distance of 1600 metres. It was originally a Group 3 race and was the traditional lead-up race for the Hong Kong Derby. In the season of 1999/2000, this race was upgraded to domestic Group 1 status. Now, it is the first of the three major races for the Hong Kong classic generation.

Winners

See also
 List of Hong Kong horse races

References 
Racing Post:
 The Hong Kong Jockey Club official website of Mercedes-Benz Hong Kong Classic Mile (2011/12)
 Racing Information of Mercedes-Benz Hong Kong Classic Mile (2011/12)
 The Hong Kong Jockey Club 

Horse races in Hong Kong
Recurring sporting events established in 1980
1980 establishments in Hong Kong